Ridder, formerly known as Leninogorsk is a city in the East Kazakhstan Region in north-eastern Kazakhstan. Its population is approximately  The city is situated in the south-western Altai Mountains and north-east of the region's capital, Oskemen, along the Ulba River, at an elevation higher than 700 metres.

History
The fact that Altai Krai is rich in natural deposits was discovered during Empress Catherine the Great's reign. The history of Ridder started in 1786 when 9 troops of men were sent to the Altai region to search for natural resource deposits. One of these troops was headed by an officer, Philip Ridder. On May 31, 1786, he found a very rich deposit containing gold, silver and other metals.

The same year, in summer, the settlement was founded there and it was named Riddersky pit. This was how the city was founded. The unique ores of the Riddersky deposit were noted by specialists of various levels and commissions. The deposit became known far beyond Russia. In 1850, Riddersky ores received the highest appreciation at The Great Exhibition in London. In 1879 the samples were included into the museum collection of the Stockholm Royal Technical Institute.

During the early 20th century Ridder experienced a number of foreign concessions, revolution and Civil war. On February 10, 1934, the settlement of Ridder was designated a town. In 1941, just before Hitler invaded the Soviet Union, the town of Ridder was renamed to Leninogorsk (in honour of Lenin).

During the Soviet period, Leninogorsk saw significant industrial growth. Several plants were constructed - the lead plant was one of the first plants for the non-ferrous industry in Kazakhstan, while Leninogorsky cascade hydro power station was the only one in Kazakhstan and the second one in Soviet Union. Several other mines and factories, including the zinc plant, were built and the college of mining and metallurgy was opened in this period.

During World War II Leninogorsk produced about 50% of the high-quality lead in the whole Soviet Union. In 2002 the city received back its original name - Ridder.

Economy

Ridder is a center of mining operations and processing of nonferrous metals. Other branches of industry include wood and textile industry, food production, and mechanical engineering.

Transport

The European route E40, originating in Calais, France, has its eastern terminus in Ridder.

Climate
Ridder has a warm-summer humid continental climate (Köppen climate classification Dfb) with mild summers and very cold winters.

Ethnic Composition

 Russians — 49,630 (85.29%)
 Kazakhs — 5,731 (9.85%)
 Germans — 624 (1.07%)
 Tatars — 588 (1.01%)
 Ukrainians — 567 (0.97%)

Points of interest
Points of interest include a local museum and a botanical garden.

Sports
In March 2013, Ridder hosted the World Ski Orienteering Championships.

References

External links
Statistical information 

Cities and towns in Kazakhstan
Populated places in East Kazakhstan Region
Populated places established in 1786
Mining communities in Kazakhstan